Knut Emil Willehard Alm (5 March 1889 – 3 June 1969) was a Swedish runner. He competed in cross-country events at the 1920 Summer Olympics and finished 30th individually. Although he was a member of the bronze medal winning Swedish cross country team, he did not receive a medal because only three best runners from each team were honored, while Hedwall was sixth.

References

External links
 

1889 births
1969 deaths
Swedish male middle-distance runners
Olympic athletes of Sweden
Athletes (track and field) at the 1920 Summer Olympics
Olympic cross country runners